This is a list of co-operative banks in Germany according to the information provided by the Bundesverband der Deutschen Volksbanken und Raiffeisenbanken (BVR) umbrella organisation.

By late 2008, there were 1,197 co-operative banks in Germany with total assets of €668 billion.

German co-operative banks are members of regional organisations. These organisations are responsible for additional support of the local bank (such as specialised salesforces or providing further education for the bank staff) as well as acting as an audit body in compliance with German banking law.

Regional organisations

Volksbanks and Raiffeisenbanks

Sparda-Bank 

 Sparda-Bank Augsburg eG, Augsburg
 Sparda-Bank Baden-Württemberg eG, Stuttgart
 Sparda-Bank Berlin eG, Berlin
 Sparda-Bank Hamburg eG, Hamburg
 Sparda-Bank Hannover eG, Hannover
 Sparda-Bank Hessen eG, Frankfurt am Main
 Sparda-Bank München eG, München
 Sparda-Bank Nürnberg eG, Nürnberg
 Sparda-Bank Regensburg eG, Regensburg
 Sparda-Bank Südwest eG, Mainz
 Sparda-Bank West eG, Düsseldorf

PSD Bank 

 PSD Bank Berlin-Brandenburg eG, Berlin
 PSD Bank Braunschweig eG, Braunschweig
 PSD Bank Hannover eG, Hannover
 PSD Bank Hessen-Thüringen eG, Eschborn
 PSD Bank Karlsruhe-Neustadt eG, Karlsruhe
 PSD Bank Kiel eG, Kiel
 PSD Bank Koblenz eG, Koblenz
 PSD Bank West eG, Köln
 PSD Bank München eG, Augsburg
 PSD Bank Nord eG, Hamburg
 PSD Bank Nürnberg eG, Nürnberg
 PSD Bank RheinNeckarSaar eG, Stuttgart
 PSD Bank Rhein-Ruhr eG, Düsseldorf
 PSD Bank Westfalen-Lippe eG, Münster (Westf.),

References 
BVR list of all cooperative banks as per 31.12.2008 (PDF; 285 kB)
2008 development report on Volksbank and Raiffeisenbank growth (PDF; 57 kB)

Bank
Germany
Lists of cooperatives
Germany